De Meyer, DeMeyer,  Demeyer, De Meijer or De Meijere is a Dutch occupational surname related to English Mayor. It is particularly common in Flanders. People with this surname include:

De Meijer
Hendrick de Meijer ((1620–1689), Dutch  landscape painter
Hendrik de Meijer (1744–1793), Dutch painter
 (1915–2000), Dutch politician
Sadiqa de Meijer (born 1977), Canadian poet
De Meijere
Johannes C. H. de Meijere (1866–1947), Dutch zoologist and entomologist
De Meyer
Adolph de Meyer (1868–1946), portrait and fashion photographer and art collector
Arnoud De Meyer, Belgian management scholar
Ingrid De Meyer, New Zealand footballer
Jan de Meyer (born 1921), Belgian jurist
Jean-Luc De Meyer (born 1957), Belgian vocalist and lyricist
 (1928–2006), Belgian archeologist and Assyriologist
Luis de Meyer (1903–?), Argentine cyclist
Olga de Meyer (1871–1930), British-born artists' model, socialite, arts patron and writer
Patrick De Meyer, Belgian songwriter, composer and producer
De Meyere
Leon De Meyere (died 1630), Flemish poet
DeMeyer
Brigitte DeMeyer (born ca. 1965), American singer-songwriter
Nicholaes DeMeyer (1635–1691), 9th Mayor of New York City
Trace DeMeyer (born 1956), Shawnee-Cherokee author, artist, poet and journalist
Demeyer
Marc Demeyer (1950–1982), Belgian road racing cyclist 
Willy Demeyer (1959-), Belgian politician

See also
Meijer (surname)
Meyer (surname)

Dutch-language surnames